Over the centuries, cities in Europe have changed a great deal, rising and falling in size and influence.
These tables give an idea of estimated population at various dates from the earliest times to the most recent:

Timeline: Neolithic–Bronze Age–Iron Age–ancient Greece–Roman Republic (7000–1 B.C.)

Timeline: Roman Empire–Modern Age (1–1800 A.D.)

Data from Hohenberg and Lees (1985) 

*Warsaw data from 1792

Data from Chandler (1987)

See also 
Historical urban community sizes
Largest cities in Europe
List of cities in Europe
List of largest cities throughout history
List of metropolitan areas in Europe
List of oldest continuously inhabited cities

Notes and references 

Histories of cities in Europe
European history
History-related lists of superlatives
Urban geography
Cities-related lists of superlatives
Largest